Sandra Kauffman is a former American Republican politician who served in the Missouri House of Representatives.

Born in Anselmo, Nebraska, she attended University of Nebraska-Lincoln.

References

20th-century American politicians
20th-century American women politicians
Republican Party members of the Missouri House of Representatives
Living people
Women state legislators in Missouri
Year of birth missing (living people)
People from Osceola, Nebraska